Going Furthur is an American-Canadian documentary film about taking Ken Kesey's bus Furthur back on the road in 2014 for a 75-day trip covering 15,000 miles, along with a group of new Merry Pranksters.

Synopsis 
Furthur is a retrofitted school bus purchased by author Ken Kesey in 1964 to carry his "Merry Band of Pranksters" cross-country. The bus was also featured in Tom Wolfe's 1968 book The Electric Kool-Aid Acid Test.

In Summer of 2014, Zane Kesey, son of Ken, took a replica of Furthur on the first major trip since Ken took the bus to Europe in 1999, on a 15,000 mile tour of the United States, stopping at music festivals and other events. The bus makes stops at The Chapel of Sacred Mirrors - Alex Grey and Allyson Grey's art sanctuary, Millbrook, New York, the infamous home of Timothy Leary and Woodstock's 45th anniversary. The film features archival footage of Hunter S. Thompson, and features interviews with Alex Grey, Lee Quarnstrom, Ken Babbs, George Walker and Wavy Gravy. The filmmakers later made 6 trips to complete the film, including visiting Burning Man festival.

Release 
The film had its premiere at San Francisco DocFest in June 2016. The film also played at Maui Film Festival, Whistler Film Festival, Byron Bay Film Festival, San Juan Film Festival and had a screening at Burning Man.

The film was nominated for an Alliance of Women Film Journalists award at the Whistler Film Festival.

Home media 

The film is slated to be released through streaming services beginning July 9, 2021.

References

External links 
 

2016 films
English-language Canadian films
2016 documentary films
American documentary films
Canadian documentary films
2010s road movies
2010s English-language films
2010s American films
2010s Canadian films